The Treaty of Poona was signed on 1 June 1817 between the East India Company and the Peshwa (ruler) of  Pune, Baji Rao II. The treaty resulted in the British gaining control of the territory north of the Narmada River and south of the Tungabhadra River.  Baji Rao also had to give up any claim to Gaikwad.  Finally, "he was not to communicate, in any manner, with any other power in India."

References

1817 in India
Indian documents
Treaties of the British East India Company
1817 treaties
June 1817 events